The Rosalie River is a river in Dominica. It rises on the eastern slopes of Morne Trois Pitons, flowing east to reach the Atlantic Ocean on the country's eastern coast, close to the town of Rosalie.

References

External links

Rivers of Dominica